Don Combs is an American Thoroughbred racehorse trainer. He was 31 years old when he trained Dust Commander to win the 1970 Kentucky Derby.

References

American horse trainers

Living people
Year of birth missing (living people)
Horse trainers from Lexington, Kentucky